Sun Come Up may refer to

 Sun Come Up (film), a 2010 film
 "Sun Come Up" (song), a Glasses Malone song
 "'Til da Sun Cums Up", a Sir Mix-a-Lot song

See also
 Sun Comes Up Again, a 2010 album by I Am Arrows